All Saints' Church, Stanton-on-the-Wolds is a Grade II listed parish church in the Church of England in Stanton-on-the-Wolds.

History
The church dates from the 11th century. It was restored in 1889 and 1952.
The church is united in one benefice with 
St Mary Magdalene's Church, Keyworth
St Mary's Church, Bunny
Bradmore Mission Room

Several groups of tombstones in the churchyard are Grade II listed.

References

Church of England church buildings in Nottinghamshire
Grade II listed churches in Nottinghamshire
11th-century church buildings in England